Sakevisual (stylized as sakevisual) is a developer and publisher of interactive story games such as visual novels and otome games, well known for their otome game RE: Alistair++. Their games are for Windows, macOS and Linux. Sakevisual is a partner of Hanako Games, Winter Wolves and Tycoon Games.

History
Sakevisual was founded by Ayu Sakata. On July 28, 2009, The Cute, Light and Fluffy Project was released, an anthology of short stories made by different people; Ayu Sakata's short story in this is called Cuter Than Fiction. Their first release was the freeware otome game, RE: Alistair. On April 10, 2010, they released an updated version with more scenes and additional content called RE: Alistair++. Sakevisual continues to release free games, but in 2010, they introduced the Green Tea Line, a series of commercial games. Ayu Sakata also wrote the stories for The Flower Shop and The Flower Shop: Winter in Fairbrook, visual novels by Winter Wolves. The Flower Shop was released on January 28, 2010, the sequel The Flower Shop: Winter in Fairbrook was released on December 8, 2011. They won the award for the "Best Fanbase" in 2011 by IndieDB.

Jisei and Kansei are the first two entries in the Green Tea Line and the first two installments of the Jisei Murder Mystery Series. Jisei and Kansei both received positive feedback in regards to its visual aspects, although reviewers agreed that the actual mysteries in the games needed work. The third installment Yousei was released on February 1, 2013. There are currently five installments planned.

Sakevisual plans to release more free games in the future; Oneiro a mystery otome game, Hanami X2 another otome game which is set in the Heian period and Every Sunrise the sequel to Ripples. Furthermore, they announced another untitled project that will be part of the Green Tea Line and therefore commercial and a new free game, Swan's Melody, with an unknown release date.

In 2013, they announced that besides Yousei they would like to release two free games and one commercial game this year. The also announced that the new game in the Green Tea Line is called Backstage Pass and is set in the same universe as RE: Alistair. It was released in August 2016.

Games

Free Games

Green Tea Line
Jisei Murder Mystery Series

Other Games

Other Games

References

External links
 

Video game publishers
Video game development companies
Video game companies of the United States